The Music is the debut album by British rock band The Music, released on 2 September 2002. It was certified gold in Japan for 100,000 copies shipped in March 2003.

Background
The Music was released on 22 September 2002, when all four band members had only recently turned eighteen years of age.

Composition
The album has been described as incorporating elements of psychedelia, dance-rock, post-grunge, electronica and hard rock.

Reception
The album received mixed reviews from critics. AllMusic wrote an enthusiastic review, calling the album "an incredible debut and a brilliant example of where rock could be headed", stating that it is more "stylish" than many of the band's contemporaries in the garage rock revival scene, namely the Hives, the Vines, and the Strokes.

Several other publications, however, were more critical of the album. Blender dubbed the album as "one of the most hilariously overheated debuts in memory" and criticised the production, scoring the album a 2 out of 5. Pitchfork also made similar complaints about the production, praising Harvey's vocals and several tracks such as "Take The Long Road and Walk It", "Too High" and "Float" but overall concluded that the album sounds "overproduced and underdeveloped" and was also lukewarm to the songwriting. They also ridiculed the band name, stating that it "makes them impossible to find on the web and the butt of any number of easy jokes".

Track listing
All tracks written by The Music.

"The Dance" – 5:08
"Take the Long Road and Walk It" – 4:53
"Human" – 5:28
"The Truth Is No Words" – 4:35
"Float" – 5:21
"Turn Out the Light" – 6:23
"The People" – 4:58
"Getaway" – 6:29
"Disco" – 6:36
"Too High" – 5:55

The UK release of this album also contains a track in the pregap called "New Instrumental", which plays upon rewinding from the start of "The Dance". A live version of this song also appeared as the B-side to "Take the Long Road and Walk It".

Personnel

The Music 

Robert Harvey – vocals, rhythm guitar
Adam Nutter – lead guitar
Stuart Coleman – bass
Phil Jordan – drums

Production 
Jim Abiss – production

Charts and certifications

Weekly charts

Certifications

See also
2002 in music

References

External links
Official UK site
Official US site

Album chart usages for BillboardHeatseekers
Album chart usages for France
Album chart usages for UK2
2002 debut albums
Virgin Records albums
Capitol Records albums
The Music (band) albums
Albums produced by Jim Abbiss